Shisa family member 4 is a protein that in humans is encoded by the SHISA4 gene.

References

Further reading